María Dolores Miró Juncosa (17 July 1930 Palma de Mallorca - 26 December 2004) was a Spanish painter, art curator, and patron.

Life 
María Dolores Miró was born in Palma de Mallorca on 17 July 1930. She was the only daughter of the painter Joan Miró ( 1893-1983 ) and his wife Pilar Juncosa Iglesias.  She was the only direct descendant of the artist.

She was the honorary president and ex officio member of the board of trustees of the Joan Miró foundations in Barcelona and Pilar, and Joan Miró in Mallorca. These centers are responsible for the dissemination and study of the work of the painter Joan Miró: the first, since the mid-1970s, while the second began its mission in the 1990s. They were also places for experimentation and exhibition of contemporary art in Europe.

Joan Miró's progressive patronage, commitment and solidarity was continued by his her, and she became a patron of the arts.

She spent part of her childhood in Paris, since due to the Spanish civil war. The Miró family took refuge in Paris in 1937, but with the Nazi invasion of France, the Miró family moved to the French countryside.

In the 1950s, the family returned to Mallorca, where Dolores's husband died. In 1965, she survived a car accident. In January 1991, the first of their four children, David Fernández Miró, poet, translator and music editor died.

She died in Palma de Mallorca on 26 December 2004. She was cremated in the Bon Sosec funeral home in Palma de Mallorca, depositing her ashes at Cementiri de Montjuïc near her parents.

References 

Spanish painters
Spanish art curators
1930 births
2004 deaths
Spanish women artists